WD repeat domain phosphoinositide-interacting protein 1 (WIPI-1), also known as Atg18 protein homolog (ATG18) and WD40 repeat protein interacting with phosphoinositides of 49 kDa (WIPI 49 kDa), is a protein that in humans is encoded by the WIPI1 gene.

Structure and function 

WD40 repeat proteins are key components of many essential biologic functions. They regulate the assembly of multiprotein complexes by presenting a beta-propeller platform for simultaneous and reversible protein–protein interactions. Members of the WIPI subfamily of WD40 repeat proteins, such as WIPI1, have a 7-bladed propeller structure and contain a conserved motif for interaction with phospholipids.

See also 
 WIPI protein family

References

Further reading